Silver Creek is a village in the town of Hanover in Chautauqua County, New York, United States. As of the 2020 census, the village had a population of 2,637. Silver Creek is named after a small creek which runs through the village. It is on the shore of Lake Erie.

History 
The community was first settled circa 1803, and the first school house was erected in approximately 1823. The village of Silver Creek was incorporated in 1848, and was an important port on Lake Erie until railroads reduced shipping. The village is home to a skew arch railroad bridge, one of the few bridges in the country built on an angle. In September of 1886, two trains collided near this location, killing approximately 15 and injuring roughly the same number.

Geography 
Silver Creek is located at 42°32'39" North, 79°10'2" West (42.544083, -79.167088). According to the United States Census Bureau, the village has a total area of 1.2 square miles (3.0 km2); all land. Silver Creek is part of the Lake Erie Basin. The two creeks in the village, Silver Creek and Walnut Creek, drain into the lake. Silver Creek is at the junction of New York State Route 5 (Central Avenue) and US Route 20 (Main Street), north of New York State Thruway (Interstate 90) Exit 58.

Silver Creek is on the New York-to-Chicago main line of CSX Transportation and the New York-Buffalo-Chicago main line of the Norfolk Southern Railway. The CSXT line through Silver Creek was formerly operated by the Consolidated Rail Corporation (Conrail), which succeeded the Penn Central (which succeeded the New York Central Railroad, which succeeded the Lake Shore and Michigan Southern Railway, which succeeded the Lake Shore Railroad, which succeeded the Buffalo & Erie Railway, the original line). The Norfolk Southern line through Silver Creek was formerly operated by the Norfolk and Western Railway, successor to the New York, Chicago and St. Louis Railroad (Nickel Plate Road [NKP]), the original line.

The Penn Central's (formerly the Pennsylvania Railroad, or PRR) Buffalo-Corry (PA)-Pittsburgh line formerly operated through Silver Creek.  The single-track lines of the NKP and PRR were jointly operated to form a double-track line which was used by the trains of both railroads. The former PRR line was abandoned around 1976 by order of the Interstate Commerce Commission in favor of highway transportation. From approximately 1907 to 1933 Silver Creek was on the Buffalo-to-Erie main line of the Buffalo & Erie Railway (successor to the Buffalo & Lake Erie Traction Company), a high-speed electric interurban railway. It was abandoned by order of the New York Public Service Commission to promote highway transportation.

Climate

Demographics 

As of the 2010 census, there were 2,656 people, 1,048 households and 718 families residing in the village. The population density was 2,213.3 people per square mile (885.3/km2). There were 1,174 housing units, with an average density of 978.3 per square mile (391.3/km2). The racial makeup of the village was 94.2 percent White, 0.9 percent African American, 1.8 percent Native American, 0.5 percent Asian, 0,7 percent from other races, and 1.8 percent from two or more races. 2.8 percent of the population were Hispanic or Latino of any race.

31.8 percent of households had children under the age of 18 living with them, 48.8 percent were married couples living together, 15 percent had a female householder with no husband present, and 31.5 percent were non-families. 26.4 percent of all households were made up of individuals, and 11 percent had someone living alone who was 65 years of age or older. The average household size was 2.51 and the average family size was 2.98.

In the village, the population was spread out, with 28 percent under the age of 20, 7 percent from 20 to 24, 25.5 percent from 25 to 44, 26.7 percent from 45 to 64, and 12.9 percent who were 65 years of age or older. The median age was 37.7 years. For every 100 females, there were 95.9 males. For every 100 females age 18 and over, there were 90.6 males.

The median 2000 income for a household in the village was $32,446, and the median income for a family was $38,617. Males had a median income of $33,889 versus $19,464 for females. The per capita income for the village was $15,904. 12.9% of the population and 9.8% of families were below the poverty line. Out of the total population, 22.8% of those under the age of 18 and 1.9% of those 65 and older were living below the poverty line.

Health care and law enforcement 
Silver Creek is served by Lake Shore Hospital in Irving, NY and Brooks Memorial Hospital in Dunkirk, NY.

Trauma cases are treated at the Erie County Medical Center in Buffalo and UPMC Hamot in Erie, Pennsylvania. In August 2009 a flash flood affected Silver Creek, Sunset Bay and Gowanda. As a result of the flood, the New York State Department of Health closed Tri-County Memorial Hospital until a building can be constructed in a different location in Gowanda. WCA Hospital in Jamestown also treats patients in the region. , the Village of Silver Creek dissolved the Police Department and contracted with the Chautauqua County Sheriff's Office for patrols along with assistance from the New York State Police when needed.

The village has a volunteer fire department with 50–60 active volunteers and junior firefighters, operating in tandem with the Silver Creek Emergency Squad. They are trained by the New York State Office of Fire Prevention and Control and the New York State Department of Health's Bureau of Emergency Medical Services. On August 9, 2009 the emergency-squad building, the village fire hall and its vehicles sustained extensive damage in a flash flood; the public works department on North Main Street was destroyed (it has since moved to a new building in the former Bentges distributing plant on Routes 5 and 20 in the Town of Hanover. Several homes along Walnut Creek were badly damaged or destroyed, and the Silver Village Trailer Park was leveled by flooding from Silver Creek. Some village streets were badly damaged or washed away by the flood waters. A funeral home, church and school were also badly damaged.

Starflight is a medivac service operating under the auspices of the Chautauqua County Sheriff's Office. Mercy Flight is a nonprofit medivac service based in Buffalo. Life Star is a medivac service affiliated with UPMC Hamot and Saint Vincent Health System in Erie. All three serve the Silver Creek area.

Grape Festival 
Every third weekend in September Silver Creek hosts a Festival of Grapes to honor Concord grapes, an important agricultural product. The festival began in 1968 and features a parade, live music, a midway, a wine tent, children's and adults' activities and a grape stomping.

In 2008, the Silver Creek Grape Festival was featured on the nationally televised Good Morning America. Diane Sawyer, Robin Roberts, Sam Champion and Chris Cuomo visited a farm to stomp grapes on their trip across America; taken during the 2008 election,  they visited 50 states in 50 days learning about the country. Diane Sawyer called it "the first and maybe last annual GMA grape stomping contest in honor of Lucille Ball, who was born 30 minutes from Silver Creek". The four participated in a grape-stomping competition.

The festival concludes every year with the grand parade which features the festival of grapes royalty, local and sometimes county or state political figures, high school marching bands from regional high schools, fire apparatus from Silver Creek, Sunset Bay, Forestville, Hanover Center, Irving, Sheridan, Lake Erie Beach, Angola, and Fredonia. Some years we are lucky to feature local shriners club from Gowanda. Also the Chautauqua County Sheriff's Office mounted unit participates. Also several different youth organizations march in the parade as well as several local fire departments and local veterans.

School
The Silver Creek Central School District has been recognized by Business First as the number-one school district in western New York, as shown by a comparison of academic outcomes and socioeconomic conditions for two years in a row.

In Silver Creek all three schools (elementary, middle and high school) are physically interconnected, to facilitate the transition to the next stage of learning. The elementary school is attached to the middle school which in turn is attached to the high school. Silver Creek maintains its own transportation department, rather than contracting for school-bus service. Its bus drivers have come from all walks of life; many are retirees. The transportation director is responsible for the district's 30 buses.

There are separate runs for pre-kindergarten to fifth-grade, and sixth- to twelfth-grade students. Four buses are used on a later run for vocational students returning from the LoGuidice Educational Center in Fredonia and students staying late for any reason. The buses are used for school-sponsored sporting events held at other schools, school-sponsored field trips and the annual Class Night party for the graduating class. In the event of a snow day or an unanticipated need for early dismissal, all local television and radio stations are contacted. If the fire-alarm system is activated apart from state-required fire drills Silver Creek Fire and EMS, Sunset Bay Fire, Battalion 1(County Fire Coordinator), County Fire 1(Director of County Emergency Services) are dispatched as 1st Alarm. Fire Chief or Asst. Fire Chief who takes role as Incident Commander at the school determines if 2nd alarm is needed from Fredonia or Dunkirk for their Tower or Ladder truck, County Rescue 71(Fredonia), Hanover Center, Forestville, Irving, and Sheridan.

There is a SADD (Students Against Destructive Decisions) chapter at the high school, counseling students against destructive decisions. It has sponsored movie nights for elementary-school students with movies, food and activities. Once every few years Forestville and/or Silver Creek try to hold a mock DWI Drill just before prom weekend in the spring.

Athletics 
The school colors are black and old gold, and its mascot is a black knight. Sports offered are cross-country for boys and girls, football and soccer for boys and soccer, swimming and volleyball for girls. The 2008–2009 boys' varsity football team played at New Era Field in Orchard Park, home of the Buffalo Bills.

Notable people
Doc Alexander, NFL football player and coach
James V. Bennett, former director of the Federal Bureau of Prisons
Samuel S. Brannan, Wisconsin politician
George Carter; Carter played for St. Bonaventure University and later in the 1971 ABA All-Star Game. Went to become an  NBA forward
Ezra Convis, politician
Albert G. Dow, former New York State Senator
Howard Ehmke, former MLB pitcher
Clinton T. Horton, former New York State Senator
Alice Lee Jemison, journalist and political activist
Cindy Miller, golfer
George Mohart, baseball player
Robert F. Young, science-fiction writer
Elisha Ward, lawyer and politician

References

External links
 Village of Silver Creek

Villages in New York (state)
Villages in Chautauqua County, New York
Populated places established in 1803
1803 establishments in New York (state)